Ectomis is a genus of Neotropical and Nearctic butterflies in the family Hesperiidae (Eudaminae).

Species
The following species are recognised in the genus Ectomis:
 Ectomis (Asina) 
 Ectomis gyges Evans, 1952 - Venezuela, Peru
Ectomis hirtius (Butler, 1870) - Venezuela
Ectomis roma Evans, 1952 - Brazil (Pará, Amazonas), Peru
Ectomis asine (Hewitson, 1867)  - Mexico through Central America to Peru
Ectomis mexicanus Freeman, 1969 - Mexico, Texas
 Ectomis (Ectomis) 
Ectomis octomaculata (Sepp, [1844]) - Mexico, Guatemala to Brazil, Suriname, Colombia, Argentina
Ectomis maizae (Hellebuyck, 1998) - Nicaragua
Ectomis auginus (Hewitson, 1867) - Mexico, Guyana, French Guiana, Colombia, Brazil (Amazonas)
Ectomis ceculus (Herrich-Schäffer, 1869) - Brazil (Rio de Janeiro)
Ectomis caunus (Herrich-Schäffer, 1869) - Mexico,  Paraguay
Ectomis metallescens (Mabille, 1888) - Brazil (Amazonas, Pará)
Ectomis kanshul (Shuey, 1991) - Mexico, Panama
Ectomis eudoxus  (Stoll, 1781) - Suriname
Ectomis minvanes (Williams, 1926) - Brazil (Mato Grosso)
Ectomis labriaris (Butler, 1877) - Brazil (Amazonas, Bahia)
Ectomis cythna (Hewitson, 1878) 
Ectomis speculum (Austin, 2008) 
Ectomis teutas (Hewitson, 1876) 
Ectomis pervivax (Hübner, [1819]) 
Ectomis bahiana (Herrich-Schäffer, 1869) - Brazil (Bahia, Pará), Peru, Venezuela
Ectomis orphne (Plötz, 1881) - Brazil (Rio de Janeiro)
Ectomis otriades (Hewitson, 1867) - Brazil (Amazonas)
Ectomis epicincea (Butler & Druce, 1872) - Mexico, Costa Rica
Ectomis perniciosus (Herrich-Schäffer, 1869) - Colombia, Brazil
Ectomis cuminaensis (d'Almeida, 1976) - Brazil (Pará)
Ectomis orpheus (Plötz, 1881) - Brazil (Pará)
Ectomis perna (Evans, 1952) - Colombia
Ectomis albovenae (Bell, 1932) - Santa Catarina, Brazil

References

Natural History Museum Lepidoptera genus database

External links
images representing Polythrix at Consortium for the Barcode of Life

Hesperiidae
Hesperiidae of South America
Hesperiidae genera
Taxa named by Paul Mabille